The Shihlin Paper Mill is a historical paper mill in Shilin District, Taipei, Taiwan.

History

Empire of Japan
In 1918, while Taiwan was under Japanese rule, the plan to establish a paper mill was initiated by Japanese merchants. In 1919, the paper mill was established under the corporation name Taiwan Paper K.K. which became the first paper mill in Taiwan.

Republic of China
After the handover of Taiwan from Japan to the Republic of China, the government took over the paper mill with the other four mills around Taiwan. They merged them into the Taiwan Paper Corporation which then became a state-owned enterprise under the Ministry of Economic Affairs. At the end of 1954, the corporation was privatized and renamed Taiwan Paper Co., Ltd.; subsequently, the mill was renamed Shihlin Mill of Taiwan Paper Co., Ltd. In 1954, Taiwan Paper Corporation was divided into several parts and managed separately; the Shihlin Mill was acquired by the private sector. In 1959, the mill was renamed Shihlin Paper Co., Ltd. In 1998, in order to accommodate the expansion of urban development throughout Shilin, the production center of the mill was moved to Taoyuan County. In 2003, the mill and its related lands and buildings were transferred to its subsidiary, Sunshine Shihlin Development Co., Ltd. for redevelopment.

Transportation
The mill is accessible within walking distance southwest of Shilin Station of Taipei Metro.

See also
 List of tourist attractions in Taiwan

References

1919 establishments in Taiwan
Buildings and structures in Taipei
Historic sites in Taiwan
Pulp and paper mills
Tourist attractions in Taipei